Nousiainen is a municipality of Finland. It is located in the Southwest Finland region,  from Turku along Highway 8 (E8). The Finnish-speaking municipality has a population of 
which 
is water. The population density is
.

There are two Natura 2000 sites in Nousiainen: the Kurjenrahka National Park and the Rehtisuo Raised Bog.

History 
Nousiainen was an "ancient parish" (a unit of social organization) before Swedish rule.

Nousiainen was the first seat of the bishop of Finland until the early 13th century, when the seat was shifted to Koroinen, nowadays a part of Turku. It remained, however, a place of pilgrimage throughout the Middle Ages. The coat of arms of Nousiainen depicts Bishop Henry and Lalli.

Nousiainen was mentioned in 1232 as de Nousia and in 1234 as Nosis. Its name is derived from a pre-Christian Finnish personal name Nousia, still the name of some 10-20 men in 2022. Even after the bishopric was moved to Koroinen, Nousiainen was still an important pilgrimage site until the reformation, as it was thought that bishop Henry was buried there. 

The village of Nummi, the current administrative seat of the municipality, was mentioned in 1380 as Nummusby. Court sessions for Nousiainen, Masku and Santamala were held there at the time. By 1556, Nummi was the largest village in Nousiainen.

Economics 
Agriculture has always been Nousiainen's most significant industry. Significant employers also included Teleste Oyj's electronics factory, which, however, has already closed down in the municipality. In 2015, the municipality had 1,009 jobs; of these, 11% were in primary production (agriculture, forestry and fishery), 72% in services and 15% in processing. The companies that paid the most corporate tax in 2016 were FCR Finland, which operates in the shipbuilding industry, Mynämäen-Nousiaisten Osuuspankki and Maalausliike Helin.

Culture

Food 
Sweetened potato casserole, or imelet perunloora in the local dialect, was named the traditional parish dish of Nousiainen in the 1980s.

Notable people 
 Mikko Rantanen (born 1996), professional ice hockey player for the Colorado Avalanche of the National Hockey League (NHL)

Gallery

See also 
 Masku

References

External links 

Municipality of Nousiainen – Official website

Municipalities of Southwest Finland
Populated places established in 1867